TRMD may refer to:
 Dampskibsselskabet Torm, a shipping company
 TRNA (guanine37-N1)-methyltransferase, an enzyme